An echocardiography, echocardiogram, cardiac echo or simply an echo, is an ultrasound of the heart.
It is a type of medical imaging of the heart, using standard ultrasound or Doppler ultrasound.

Echocardiography has become routinely used in the diagnosis, management, and follow-up of patients with any suspected or known heart diseases. It is one of the most widely used diagnostic imaging modalities in cardiology. It can provide a wealth of helpful information, including the size and shape of the heart (internal chamber size quantification), pumping capacity, location and extent of any tissue damage, and assessment of valves. An echocardiogram can also give physicians other estimates of heart function, such as a calculation of the cardiac output, ejection fraction, and diastolic function (how well the heart relaxes).

Echocardiography is an important tool in assessing wall motion abnormality in patients with suspected cardiac disease. It is a tool which helps in reaching an early diagnosis of myocardial infarction, showing regional wall motion abnormality. Also, it is important in treatment and follow-up in patients with heart failure, by assessing ejection fraction.

Echocardiography can help detect cardiomyopathies, such as hypertrophic cardiomyopathy, dilated cardiomyopathy, and many others. The use of stress echocardiography may also help determine whether any chest pain or associated symptoms are related to heart disease. The biggest advantage of echocardiography is that it is not invasive (does not involve breaking the skin or entering body cavities) and has no known risks or side effects.
Not only can an echocardiogram create ultrasound images of heart structures, but it can also produce accurate assessment of the blood flowing through the heart by Doppler echocardiography, using pulsed- or continuous-wave Doppler ultrasound. This allows assessment of both normal and abnormal blood flow through the heart. Color Doppler, as well as spectral Doppler, is used to visualize any abnormal communications between the left and right sides of the heart, any leaking of blood through the valves (valvular regurgitation), and estimate how well the valves open (or do not open in the case of valvular stenosis). The Doppler technique can also be used for tissue motion and velocity measurement, by tissue Doppler echocardiography.

Echocardiography was also the first ultrasound subspecialty to use intravenous contrast. Echocardiography is performed by cardiac sonographers, cardiac physiologists (UK), or physicians trained in echocardiography.

Recognized as the "Father of Echocardiography", the Swedish physician Inge Edler (1911–2001), a graduate of Lund University, was the first of his profession to apply ultrasonic pulse echo imaging in diagnosing cardiac disease, which the acoustical physicist Floyd Firestone had developed to detect defects in metal castings. In fact, Edler in 1953 produced the first echocardiographs using an industrial Firestone-Sperry Ultrasonic Reflectoscope. In developing echocardiography, Edler worked with the physicist Carl Hellmuth Hertz, the son of the Nobel laureate Gustav Hertz and grandnephew of Heinrich Rudolph Hertz.

Medical uses

Health societies recommend the use of echocardiography for initial diagnosis when a change in the patient's clinical status occurs and when new data from an echocardiogram would result in the physician changing the patient's care. Diagnostic criteria for numerous cardiac diseases are based on echocardiography studies. For example, the differentiation of mild, moderate, and severe valvular disease is based upon measured criteria. Another example is the estimation of heart function by the left ventricular ejection fraction (LVEF) has vast uses including classification of heart failure and cut offs for implantation of implantable cardioverter-defibrillators.

Health societies do not recommend routine testing when the patient has no change in clinical status or when a physician is unlikely to change care for the patient based on the results of testing. A common example of overuse of echocardiography when not indicated is the use of routine testing in response to a patient diagnosis of mild valvular heart disease. In this case, patients are often asymptomatic for years before the onset of deterioration and the results of the echocardiogram would not result in a change in care without other change in clinical status.

Echocardiography now has a vast role in pediatrics, diagnosing patients with valvular heart disease and other congenital abnormalities. An emerging branch is fetal echocardiography, which involves echocardiography of an unborn fetus.

Types
There are three primary types of echocardiography: transthoracic, transesophageal, and intracardic.
Stress testing utilizes tranthoracic echo in combination with an exercise modality (e.g., a treadmill).
Intravascular ultrasound is included below, but is as the name indicates more "ultrasound" than "echocardiography" as it is imaging the walls of a vessel rather than the heart.

Transthoracic echocardiogram

A standard echocardiogram is also known as a transthoracic echocardiogram (TTE) or cardiac ultrasound; and it is used for rapid evaluation of a patient at their bedside.  In this case, the echocardiography transducer (or probe) is placed on the chest wall (or thorax) of the subject, and images are taken through the chest wall. This is a non-invasive, highly accurate, and quick assessment of the overall function of the heart.

TTE utilizes several "windows" to image the heart from different perspectives. Each window has advantages and disadvantages for viewing specific structures within the heart and, typically, numerous windows are utilized within the same study to fully assess the heart. Parasternal long and parasternal short axis windows are taken next to the sternum, the apical two/three/four chamber windows are taken from the apex of the heart (lower left side), and the subcostal window is taken from underneath the edge of the last rib.

TTE utilizes one- ("M mode"), two-, and three-dimensional ultrasound (time is implicit and not included) from the different windows. These can be combined with pulse wave or continuous wave Doppler to visualize the velocity of blood flow and structure movements. Images can be enhanced with "contrast" that are typically some sort of micro bubble suspension that reflect the ultrasound waves.

Transesophageal echocardiogram

A transesophageal echocardiogram is an alternative way to perform an echocardiogram. A specialized probe containing an ultrasound transducer at its tip is passed into the patient's esophagus via the mouth, allowing image and Doppler evaluation from a location directly behind the heart. It is most often used when transthoracic images are suboptimal and when a clearer and more precise image is needed for assessment. This test is performed in the presence of a cardiologist, anesthesiologist, registered nurse, and ultrasound technologist. Conscious sedation and/or localized numbing medication may be used to make the patient more comfortable during the procedure.

TEE, unlike TTE, does not have discrete "windows" to view the heart. The entire esophagus and stomach can be utilized, and the probe advanced or removed along this dimension to alter the perspective on the heart. Most probes include the ability to deflect the tip of the probe in one or two dimensions to further refine the perspective of the heart. Additionally, the ultrasound crystal is often a two-dimension crystal and the ultrasound plane being used can be rotated electronically to permit an additional dimension to optimize views of the heart structures. Often, movement in all of these dimensions is needed.

TEE can be used as stand-alone procedures, or incorporated into catheter- or surgical-based procedures. For example, during a valve replacement surgery the TEE can be used to assess the valve function immediately before repair/replacement and immediately after. This permits revising the valve mid-surgery, if needed, to improve outcomes of the surgery.

Stress echocardiography 

A stress echocardiogram, also known as a stress echo, uses ultrasound imaging of the heart to assess the wall motion in response to physical stress. First, images of the heart are taken "at rest" to acquire a baseline of the patient's wall motion at a resting heart rate. The patient then walks on a treadmill or uses another exercise modality to increase the heart rate to his or her target heart rate, or 85% of the age-predicted maximum heart rate (220 − patient's age). Finally, images of the heart are taken "at stress" to assess wall motion at the peak heart rate. A stress echo assesses wall motion of the heart; it does not, however, create an image of the coronary arteries directly. Ischemia of one or more coronary arteries could cause a wall motion abnormality, which could indicate coronary artery disease. The gold standard test to directly create an image of the coronary arteries and directly assess for stenosis or occlusion is a cardiac catheterization. A stress echo is not invasive and is performed in the presence of a licensed medical professional, such as a cardiologist, and a cardiac sonographer.

Intracardiac echocardiography 

Intracardiac echocardiography (ICE) is specialized form of echocardiography that uses catheters to insert the ultrasound probe inside the heart to view structures from within the heart.
ICE is often used as a part of the cardiac procedure of crossing the interatrial septum with a transseptal puncture to permit catheter access from the right atrium to the left atrium; alternative access to the left heart would be retrograde through the aorta and across the aortic valve into the left ventricle.

ICE has the benefit over transthoracic echocardiography in that an operator who is performing a sterile procedure can also operate the ICE catheter and it is not limited to visibility problems that can arise with transthoracic or transesophageal echo. Though, there are image quality limitations due to size constraints of the probe being limited to a catheter.

ICE is often inserted through the femoral vein and into the right atrium.
From the right atrium, visualization of the interatrial septum, all four cardiac chambers, all four valves, and the pericardial space (for an effusion) can be readily visualized.
It can also be advanced across the atrial septum into the left atrium to visualize the left atrial appendage during left atrial appendage occlusion device deployment.

Utilization of ICE imagery can be incorporated into the 3-D models built with electroanatomic mapping systems.

Intravascular ultrasound

Intravascular ultrasound (IVUS) is a specialized form of echocardiography that uses a catheter to insert the ultrasound probe inside blood vessels. This is commonly used to measure the size of blood vessels and to measure the internal diameter of the blood vessel. For example, this can be used in a coronary angiogram to assess the narrowing of the coronary artery. If the catheter is retraced in a controlled manner, then an internal map can be generated to see the contour of the vessel and its branches.

Modes

The various modes listed below essentially describe how the ultrasound crystals are used to obtain information.
These modes are common to all types of echocardiography.

A-mode
Amplitude mode is not a mode used in modern echocardiography.

B-mode / 2D
Brightness mode is often synonymous with "2D" and is very commonly used in echocardiography.

M-mode
Motion mode is infrequently used in modern echocardiography. It has specific uses and has the benefit of very high temporal fidelity (e.g., measuring LV size at end diastole).

Strain rate imaging (deformation echocardiography)

Strain rate imaging is an ultrasound method for imaging regional differences in contraction (dyssynergy) in for instance ischemic heart disease or dyssynchrony due to Bundle branch block. Strain rate imaging measures either regional systolic deformation (strain) or the rate of regional deformation (strain rate). The methods used are either tissue Doppler or Speckle tracking echocardiography.

Three-dimensional echocardiography

Three-dimensional echocardiography (also known as four-dimensional echocardiography when the picture is moving) is now possible, using a matrix array ultrasound probe and an appropriate processing system. It enables detailed anatomical assessment of cardiac pathology, particularly valvular defects, and cardiomyopathies. The ability to slice the virtual heart in infinite planes in an anatomically appropriate manner and to reconstruct three-dimensional images of anatomic structures make it unique for the understanding of the congenitally malformed heart. Real-time three-dimensional echocardiography can be used to guide the location of bioptomes during right ventricular endomyocardial biopsies, placement of catheter-delivered valvular devices, and in many other intraoperative assessments.

Three-dimensional echocardiography technology may feature anatomical intelligence, or the use of organ-modeling technology, to automatically identify anatomy based on generic models.  All generic models refer to a dataset of anatomical information that uniquely adapts to variability in patient anatomy to perform specific tasks. Built on feature recognition and segmentation algorithms, this technology can provide patient-specific three-dimensional modeling of the heart and other aspects of the anatomy, including the brain, lungs, liver, kidneys, rib cage, and vertebral column.

Contrast echocardiography
Contrast echocardiography or contrast-enhanced ultrasound is the addition of an ultrasound contrast medium, or imaging agent, to traditional ultrasonography. The ultrasound contrast is made up of tiny microbubbles filled with a gas core and protein shell. This allows the microbubbles to circulate through the cardiovascular system and return the ultrasound waves, creating a highly reflective image. There are multiple applications in which contrast-enhanced ultrasound can be useful. The most commonly used application is in the enhancement of LV endocardial borders for assessment of global and regional systolic function. Contrast may also be used to enhance visualization of wall thickening during stress echocardiography, for the assessment of LV thrombus, or for the assessment of other masses in the heart. Contrast echocardiography has also been used to assess blood perfusion throughout myocardium in the case of coronary artery disease.

Accreditation
Echocardiography can at many times be subjective, meaning that the person reading the echo may have personal input that affects the interpretation of the findings, leading to so-called "inter-observer variability", where different echocardiographers might produce different reports when examining the same images. It necessitated the development of accreditation programs around the world. The aim of such programs is to standardize the practice of echocardiography and to ensure that practitioners have the proper training prior to practicing echocardiography which will eventually limit inter-observer variability.

Europe
At the European level  individual and laboratory accreditation is provided by the European Association of Echocardiography (EAE). There are three subspecialties for individual accreditation: Adult Transthoracic Echocardiography (TTE), Adult Transesophageal Echocardiography (TEE) and Congenital Heart Disease Echocardiography (CHD).

UK
In the UK, accreditation is regulated by the British Society of Echocardiography. Accredited radiographers, sonographers, or other professionals are required to pass a mandatory exam.

United States
The "Intersocietal Accreditation Commission for Echocardiography” (IAC) sets standards for echo labs across the US. Cardiologists and sonographers who wish to have their laboratory accredited by IAC must comply with these standards. The purpose of accreditation is to maintain quality and consistency across echocardiography labs in the United States. Accreditation is offered in adult and pediatric transthoracic and transesophageal echocardiography, as well as adult stress and fetal echo. Accreditation is a two-part process. Each facility will conduct a detailed self-evaluation, paying close attention to the IAC Standards and Guidelines. The facility will then complete the application and submit actual case studies to the board of directors for review. Once all requirements have been met, the lab will receive certification. IAC certification is a continual process and must be maintained by the facility: it may include audits or site visits by the IAC. There are several states in which Medicare and/or private insurance carriers require accreditation (credentials) of the laboratory and/or sonographer for reimbursement of echocardiograms.

There are two credentialing bodies in the United States for sonographers, the Cardiovascular Credentialing International (CCI), established in 1968, and the American Registry for Diagnostic Medical Sonography (ARDMS), established in 1975. Both CCI and ARDMS have earned the prestigious ANSI-ISO 17024 accreditation for certifying bodies from the International Organization for Standardization (ISO). Accreditation is granted through the American National Standards Institute (ANSI). Recognition of ARDMS programs in providing credentials has also earned the ARDMS accreditation with the National Commission for Certifying Agencies (NCCA). The NCCA is the accrediting arm of the National Organization for Competency Assurance (NOCA).

Under both credentialing bodies, sonographers must first document completion of prerequisite requirements, which contain both didactic and hands-on experience in the field of ultrasound. Applicants must then take a comprehensive exam demonstrating knowledge in both the physics of ultrasound and the clinical competency related to their specialty. Credentialed sonographers are then required to maintain competency in their field by obtaining a certain number of Continuing Medical Education credits, or CME's.

In 2009, New Mexico and Oregon became the first two states to require licensure of sonographers.

The American Society of Echocardiography (ASE) is a professional organization made up of physicians, sonographers, nurses, and scientists involved in the field of echocardiography. One of the most important roles that the ASE plays is providing their recommendations through the ASE Guidelines and Standards, providing resource and educational opportunities for sonographers and physicians in the field.

There have been various institutes who are working on use of Artificial intelligence in Echo but they are at a very early stage and still needs full development.

Terminology 
The most commonly used terminology in echocardiography diagnostics are:

 BSA – body surface area
 DT – deceleration time
 IVRT – isovolumic relaxation time
 LA – left atrium
 RA – right atrium
 LV –  left ventricle
 RV –  right ventricle
 LVOT – left ventricular outflow tract
 RVOT – right ventricular outflow tract
 PHT – pressure half time
 TAPSE – tricuspid annular plane systolic excursion
 VC – vena contracta
 EDD – end diastolic diameter
 ESD – end systolic diameter
 IVSd – interventricular septal end diastole
 PWd – posterior wall thickness
 LVMI – left ventricular mass index
 Ao asc – ascending aorta
 ST Jxn – sinotubular junction
 LAVI – left atrial volume index
 EDV – end-diastolic volume
 ESV – end-systolic volume
 EF – ejection fraction
 FS – fractional shortening
 RAVI – right atrial volume index
 RVOT – right ventricular outflow tract
 RVD – basal RV diameter
 IVC – inferior vena cava
 GLS – global longitudinal strain
 RVSP – right ventricular systolic pressure
 E/A ratio

See also
 Angiogram
 Aortic valve area calculation
 Electrocardiogram
 Fetal echocardiography

References

External links

 Echocardiography (Views, normal values, measurements, free software...) – TECHmED
 Virtual TEE – online self-study and teaching resource
 echocardia – online self-study and teaching resource
 Echobasics – free online echocardiography tutorial
 CT2TEE – transesophageal echocardiography simulator

Cardiac imaging
Medical ultrasonography
Radiology
Cardiology